Lin Tzu-chi  (formerly Lin Wan-hsuan;  born 19 March 1988) is a Taiwanese weightlifter. She was to appear at the 2010 Asian Games, but was suspended from competition due to a positive drug test. Lin was banned until 2012. At the 2014 Asian Games, she set a world record in women's 63 kg, with a lift of 261 kg. She also set the clean and jerk record for her weight class, at 145 kg. The government of Taiwan awarded her NT$3 million for this accomplishment. Lin was suspended from the 2016 Summer Olympics due to another positive drug test result. The Court of Arbitration for Sport ruled in November 2018, after an appeal by the World Anti-Doping Agency, that Lin was to serve an eight-year suspension, and additionally vacated all weightlifting medals, prizes and points earned by Lin after 24 June 2016.

She attends Kaohsiung Medical University.

References

1988 births
Living people
People from Kinmen County
Taiwanese female weightlifters
Asian Games gold medalists for Chinese Taipei
Asian Games medalists in weightlifting
Weightlifters at the 2014 Asian Games
World record holders in Olympic weightlifting
Kaohsiung Medical University alumni
Medalists at the 2014 Asian Games
Taiwanese sportspeople in doping cases
Doping cases in wrestling
21st-century Taiwanese women